The Family and Small Business Taxpayer Protection Act is a proposed United States law that would rescind the expansion of the Internal Revenue Service included in the Inflation Reduction Act of 2022. It was the first bill to be introduced in the 118th Congress.

Proponents of the bill, Congressional Republicans, claim that the bill is necessary to protect middle-class Americans from increased audits and scrutiny from the IRS and hold the institution accountable. Opponents of the bill, Congressional Democrats and President Joe Biden, claim that the bill would allow higher-income Americans to avoid paying taxes and would increase the national debt.

References

Proposed legislation of the 118th United States Congress
United States proposed federal taxation legislation